Paramaxillaria amatrix is a species of snout moth described by Hans Zerny in 1927. It is found in Spain.

References

Moths described in 1927
Phycitini